There are many different types of cheese.  Cheeses can be grouped or classified according to criteria such as length of fermentation, texture, methods of production, fat content, animal milk, and country or region of origin. The method most commonly and traditionally used is based on moisture content, which is then further narrowed down by fat content and curing or ripening methods. The criteria may either be used singly or in combination, with no single method being universally used.

The combination of types produces around 51 different varieties recognized by the International Dairy Federation, over 400 identified by Walter and Hargrove, over 500 by Burkhalter, and over 1,000 by Sandine and Elliker. Some attempts have been made to rationalise the classification of cheese; a scheme was proposed by Pieter Walstra that uses the primary and secondary starter combined with moisture content, and Walter and Hargrove suggested classifying by production methods. This last scheme results in 18 types, which are then further grouped by moisture content.

Fresh and whey cheeses 

The main factor in categorizing these cheeses is age. Fresh cheeses without additional preservatives can spoil in a matter of days.

For these simplest cheeses, milk is curdled and drained, with little other processing. Examples include cottage cheese, cream cheese, curd cheese, farmer cheese, caș, chhena, fromage blanc, queso fresco, paneer, fresh goat's milk chèvre, Breingen-Tortoille, Irish Mellieriem Rochers and Belgian Mellieriem Rochers. Such cheeses are often soft and spreadable, with a mild flavour.

Whey cheeses are fresh cheeses made from whey, a by-product from the process of producing other cheeses which would otherwise be discarded. Corsican brocciu, Italian ricotta, Romanian urda, Greek mizithra, Croatian skuta, Cypriot anari cheese, Himalayan chhurpi and Norwegian Brunost are examples. Brocciu is mostly eaten fresh, and is as such a major ingredient in Corsican cuisine, but it can also be found in an aged form.

Some fresh cheeses such as fromage blanc and fromage frais (the latter differing from the former in that it contains live cultures) are commonly sold and consumed as desserts.

Stretched curd cheeses

Stretched curd, for which the Italian term pasta filata is often used, is a group of cheeses where the hot curd is stretched, today normally mechanically, producing various effects.  Many traditional pasta filata cheeses such as the Italian mozzarella and halloumi from the Eastern Mediterranean also fall into the fresh cheese category. Fresh curds are stretched and kneaded in hot water to form a ball of mozzarella, which in southern Italy is usually eaten within a few hours of being made. Stored in brine, it can easily be shipped, and it is known worldwide for its use on pizza. But not all stretch-curd cheeses are fresh; the Italian provolone, Ragusano, caciocavallo and many others are hard or semi-hard, and aged. Oaxaca cheese from Mexico is semi-hard, but not aged.  Like the pressed cooked cheeses (below), all these are made using thermophilic lactic fermentation starters. Many of the various types of string cheese are made this way.

Cooked pressed cheeses

Swiss-type cheeses, also known as Alpine cheeses, are a group of hard or semi-hard cheeses with a distinct character, whose origins lie in the Alps of Europe, although they are now eaten and imitated in most cheesemaking parts of the world. They are classified as "cooked", meaning made using thermophilic lactic fermentation starters, incubating the curd with a period at a high temperature of 45°C or more.  Since they are later pressed to expel excess moisture, the group are also described as "'cooked pressed cheeses'", fromages à pâte pressée cuite in French.  Their distinct character arose from the requirements of cheese made in the summer on high Alpine grasslands (alpage in French), and then transported with the cows down to the valleys in the winter, in the historic culture of Alpine transhumance. Traditionally the cheeses were made in large rounds or "wheels" with a hard rind, and were robust enough for both keeping and transporting.  

The best known cheeses of the type, all made from cow's milk, include the Swiss Emmental, Gruyère and Appenzeller, as well as the French Beaufort and Comté (from the Jura Mountains, near the Alps). Both countries have many other traditional varieties, as do the Alpine regions of Austria (Alpkäse) and Italy (Asiago), though these have not achieved the same degree of intercontinental fame.  Most global modern production is industrial, and usually made in rectangular blocks, and by wrapping in plastic no rind is allowed to form.  Historical production was all with "raw" milk, although the periods of high heat in making largely controlled unwelcome bacteria, but modern production may use thermized or pasteurized milk.

The general eating characteristics of the Alpine cheeses are a firm but still elastic texture, flavor that is not sharp, acidic or salty, but rather nutty and buttery. When melted, which they often are in cooking, they are "gooey", and "slick, stretchy and runny".

Another related group of cooked pressed cheeses is the very hard Italian "grana" cheeses; the best known are Parmesan and Grana Padano. Although their origins lie in the flat and (originally) swampy Po Valley, they share the broad Alpine cheesemaking process, and began after local monasteries initiated drainage programmes from the 11th century onwards. These were Benedictine and Cistercian monasteries, both with sister-houses benefiting from Alpine cheesemaking. They seem to have borrowed their techniques from them, but produced very different cheeses, using much more salt, and less heating, which suited the local availability of materials.

Moisture: soft to hard

Categorizing cheeses by moisture content or firmness is a common but inexact practice. The lines between soft, semi-soft, semi-hard and hard are arbitrary, and many types of cheese are made in softer or firmer variants. The factor that controls cheese hardness is moisture content, which depends on the pressure with which it is packed into molds, and upon aging time.

Soft cheese 

Cream cheeses are not matured. Brie and Neufchâtel are soft-type cheeses that mature for no more than a month. Neufchâtel is a soft cheese which can be sold after 10 days of maturation.

Semi-soft cheese 
Semi-soft cheeses, and the sub-group Monastery cheeses, have a high moisture content and tend to be mild-tasting.  Well-known varieties include Havarti, Munster, Port Salut and Butterkäse.

Medium-hard cheese 
Cheeses that range in texture from semi-soft to firm include Swiss-style cheeses such as Emmental and Gruyère. The same bacteria that give such cheeses their eyes also contribute to their aromatic and sharp flavours. Other semi-soft to firm cheeses include Gouda, Edam, Jarlsberg, Cantal, and Kashkaval/Cașcaval. Cheeses of this type are ideal for melting and are often served on toast for quick snacks or simple meals.

Semi-hard cheese 

Harder cheeses have a lower moisture content than softer cheeses. They are generally packed into molds under more pressure and aged for a longer time than the soft cheeses. Cheeses that are classified as semi-hard to hard include the familiar Cheddar, originating in the village of Cheddar in England but now used as a generic term for this style of cheese, of which varieties are imitated worldwide and are marketed by strength or the length of time they have been aged.
Cheddar is one of a family of semi-hard or hard cheeses (including Cheshire and Gloucester), whose curd is cut, gently heated, piled, and stirred before being pressed into forms. Colby and Monterey Jack are similar but milder cheeses; their curd is rinsed before it is pressed, washing away some acidity and calcium. A similar curd-washing takes place when making the Dutch cheeses Edam and Gouda.

Hard cheese 
Hard cheeses—grating cheeses such as Grana Padano, Parmesan or Pecorino—are quite firmly packed into large forms and aged for months or years.

Source of milk

Some cheeses are categorized by the source of the milk used to produce them or by the added fat content of the milk from which they are produced. While most of the world's commercially available cheese is made from cow's milk, many parts of the world also produce cheese from goats and sheep. Examples include Roquefort (produced in France) and Pecorino (produced in Italy) from ewe's milk. One farm in Sweden also produces cheese from moose's milk. Sometimes cheeses marketed under the same name are made from milk of different species—feta cheeses, for example, are made from sheep's milk in Greece. Pule cheese are made from Balkan donkey milk and goat's milk (produced in Serbia).

Double cream cheeses are soft cheeses of cows' milk enriched with cream so that their fat in dry matter (FDM or FiDM) content is 60–75%; triple cream cheeses are enriched to at least 75%.

Mold 

There are three main categories of cheese in which the presence of mold is an important feature: soft-ripened cheeses, washed-rind cheeses and blue cheeses.

Soft-ripened 
Soft-ripened cheeses begin firm and rather chalky in texture, but are aged from the exterior inwards by exposing them to mold. The mold may be a velvety bloom of P. camemberti that forms a flexible white crust and contributes to the smooth, runny, or gooey textures and more intense flavours of these aged cheeses. Brie and Camembert, the most famous of these cheeses, are made by allowing white mold to grow on the outside of a soft cheese for a few days or weeks. Goat's milk cheeses are often treated in a similar manner, sometimes with white molds (Chèvre-Boîte) and sometimes with blue.

Washed-rind 

Washed-rind cheeses are soft in character and ripen inwards like those with white molds; however, they are treated differently. Washed-rind cheeses are periodically cured in a solution of saltwater brine or mold-bearing agents that may include beer, wine, brandy and spices, making their surfaces amenable to a class of bacteria (Brevibacterium linens, the reddish-orange smear bacteria) that impart pungent odors and distinctive flavours and produce a firm, flavourful rind around the cheese. Washed-rind cheeses can be soft (Limburger), semi-hard, or hard (Appenzeller). The same bacteria can also have some effect on cheeses that are simply ripened in humid conditions, like Camembert. The process requires regular washings, particularly in the early stages of production, making it quite labor-intensive compared to other methods of cheese production.

Smear-ripened 
S-rind cheeses are also smear-ripened with solutions of bacteria or fungi (most commonly Brevibacterium linens, Debaryomyces hansenii or Geotrichum candidum), which usually gives them a stronger flavor as the cheese matures. In some cases, older cheeses are smeared on young cheeses to transfer the microorganisms. Many, but not all, of these cheeses have a distinctive pinkish or orange coloring of the exterior. Unlike with other washed-rind cheeses, the washing is done to ensure uniform growth of desired bacteria or fungi and to prevent the growth of undesired molds. Examples of smear-ripened cheeses include Munster and Port Salut.

Blue 
So-called blue cheese is created by inoculating a cheese with Penicillium roqueforti or Penicillium glaucum. This is done while the cheese is still in the form of loosely pressed curds, and may be further enhanced by piercing a ripening block of cheese with skewers in an atmosphere in which the mold is prevalent. The mold grows within the cheese as it ages. These cheeses have distinct blue veins, which gives them their name and, often, assertive flavours. The molds range from pale green to dark blue, and may be accompanied by white and crusty brown molds. Their texture can be soft or firm. Some of the most renowned cheeses in this type include Roquefort, Gorgonzola and Stilton.

Granular

Granular cheese is a type of cheese produced by repeatedly stirring and draining a mixture of curd and whey. It can refer to a wide variety of cheeses, including the grana cheeses such as Parmigiano-Reggiano.

Brined

Brined or pickled cheese is matured in a solution of brine in an airtight or semi-permeable container. This process gives the cheese good stability, inhibiting bacterial growth even in hot countries. Brined cheeses may be soft or hard, varying in moisture content, and in color and flavor, according to the type of milk used. All will be rindless, and generally taste clean, salty and acidic when fresh, developing some piquancy when aged, and most will be white. Varieties of brined cheese include bryndza, feta, halloumi, sirene, and telemea. Brined cheese is the main type of cheese produced and eaten in the Middle East and Mediterranean areas.

Processed 

Processed cheese is made from traditional cheese and emulsifying salts, often with the addition of milk, more salt, preservatives, and food coloring. Its texture is consistent, and it melts smoothly. It is sold packaged and either pre-sliced or unsliced, in several varieties. Some are sold as sausage-like logs and chipolatas (mostly in Germany and the US), and some are molded into the shape of animals and objects. It is also available as "Easy Cheese", a product distributed by Mondelez International, that is packaged in aerosol cans and available in some countries.

Some, if not most, varieties of processed cheese are made using a combination of real cheese waste (which is steam-cleaned, boiled and further processed), whey powders, and various mixtures of vegetable oils, palm oils or fats. Some processed-cheese slices contain as little as two to six percent cheese; some have smoke flavours added.

Notes

References
Donnelley, Catherine W. (ed), Cheese and Microbes, 2014, ASM Press, 9781555818593, google books
Fox, P.H., ed., Fundamentals of Cheese Science, 2000, Springer Science & Business Media, 9780834212602, google books
Kinstedt, Paul, Cheese and Culture: A History of Cheese and its Place in Western Civilization, 2012, Chelsea Green Publishing, 9781603584128, google books
Lortal, Sylvie, "Cheeses made with Thermophilic Lactic Starters", Chapter 16 in Handbook of Food and Beverage Fermentation Technology, 2004, CRC Press, 9780203913550, google books 
"Oxford": Donnelley, Catherine W. (ed), The Oxford Companion to Cheese, 2016, Oxford University Press, 9780199330881, google books 
Thorpe, Liz, The Book of Cheese: The Essential Guide to Discovering Cheeses You'll Love, 2017, Flatiron Books, 9781250063465, google books